Edon Júnior Viegas Amaral (born 7 March 1994), known as Edinho Júnior, is a Portuguese professional footballer who plays as a forward.

Career
Edinho started his career in Portuguese club S.C. Olhanense's youth team where he caught the eye of Scottish Premier League side Celtic, who were rumored to be interested in signing the player for £500,000.

Blackburn Rovers
In June 2012, Edinho went on trial at English club Blackburn Rovers and signed for the club on 25 July 2012 after impressing in the trial, for an undisclosed fee on a three-year contract. Edinho was allocated the squad number 19 and made his first team debut in a 2–1 win against Leicester City at Ewood Park, Edinho started the game and played in the first half, before he was replaced by David Goodwillie for the second half. On 13 February 2013 Edinho signed on loan for an I-League club Shillong Lajong.

Shillong Lajong (loan)
Edinho joined the I-League side Shillong Lajong on loan on 15 February 2013 until 30 June 2013. He made his debut against Pune FC on 24 March 2013. He scored two goals as the match ended 2–2. In total, he made six appearances and scored two goals for Shillong Lajong.
FIFA has made a documentary on him and his dancing skills for the club and released it as FIFA Football Mundial- A dancing 'Hero' in India.

Whitehawk (loan)
On 19 July 2013, Edinho joined newly promoted Conference South side Whitehawk on a one-month loan deal. On 18 September 2013, he returned to Blackburn after making three appearances for Whitehawk.

Harrisburg City Islanders
On 24 January 2014, Edinho joined USL Pro side Harrisburg City Islanders on a free transfer.

Farense
In July 2014, Edinho joined Segunda Liga side Farense.

International career
Edinho made his debut for Portugal U19 on 8 February 2013, coming on as a 58th-minute substitute in a 3–0 friendly win over Norway U19. Then, in June 2013, he played in 2013 UEFA European Under-19 Football Championship elite qualification against Bulgaria U19, a 7–0 win, and Czech Republic U19, a 4–1 win, coming on as substitute in both games.

Personal life
Edinho is the son of former Brazilian footballer Edon Amaral Neto.He is married with Bianca Iulia Safta Amaral since 2021.

Career statistics

References

External links

1994 births
Living people
Portuguese footballers
People from Faro, Portugal
Portugal youth international footballers
Association football forwards
Liga Portugal 2 players
English Football League players
I-League players
National League (English football) players
USL Championship players
Liga I players
S.C. Olhanense players
Blackburn Rovers F.C. players
Shillong Lajong FC players
Whitehawk F.C. players
Penn FC players
S.C. Farense players
S.R. Almancilense players
CS Gaz Metan Mediaș players
Portuguese expatriate footballers
Portuguese expatriate sportspeople in England
Expatriate footballers in England
Portuguese expatriate sportspeople in India
Expatriate footballers in India
Portuguese expatriate sportspeople in the United States
Expatriate soccer players in the United States
Portuguese expatriate sportspeople in Germany
Expatriate footballers in Germany
Portuguese expatriate sportspeople in Romania
Expatriate footballers in Romania
Sportspeople from Faro District